Hugh Mitchell (born September 7, 1989) is a former English actor, best known for playing Colin Creevey in Harry Potter and the Chamber of Secrets. He also appeared in The White Queen as Richard Welles, alongside Max Irons.

Mitchell attended The Pilgrims' School, Winchester, from 1999 to 2003. After Pilgrims' he went to the King Edward VI School, Southampton, from 2003 to 2006 and later Peter Symonds College.

Filmography

Film

Television

Video Games

Source:

References

External links

 
 http://www.curtisbrown.co.uk/hugh-mitchell//works/

English male film actors
Living people
People educated at King Edward VI School, Southampton
Male actors from Hampshire
Actors from Winchester
21st-century English male actors
People educated at Peter Symonds College
English male child actors
1989 births